Udoka Favour Godwin-Malife (born 9 May 2000) is an English professional footballer who plays for Forest Green Rovers, as a defender.

Career
Godwin-Malife began his career with Oxford City, before signing with Forest Green Rovers in January 2019. He moved on loan to Eastleigh in January 2020.

In June 2021 he signed a new two-year contract with Forest Green.

Career statistics

Honours

Forest Green Rovers
League Two: 2021–22

References

2000 births
Living people
English footballers
Association football defenders
National League (English football) players
English Football League players
Oxford City F.C. players
Forest Green Rovers F.C. players
Eastleigh F.C. players
Black British sportspeople